Bundal Island (}) is a small island located in the Arabian Sea off the coast of Karachi, Sindh. It is an inhabited island on which an old Sufi Saint, Yousuf Shah's shrine is also present.

Yusuf Shah 
On the island lies the tomb of the Sufi saint Yusuf Shah. The annual urs of Yusuf Shah attract thousands of coastal people to the island. Churna and Buddo Islands are also located near Bundal Island. There is a dispute between the provincial government of Sindh and Port Qasim Authority on the ownership rights of 12,000 acres (49 km2) of land in these Islands.

Pakistan Islands Development Authority 
Bundal Island is part of $50 billion development of city under Pakistan Islands Development Authority.

Development of Bundal Island 
In 2013, Bahria Town signed a joint venture with the companies of Thomas Kramer to develop Bodha Island City on Bundal and Buddo Islands with a cost of $20 Billion. Covering 12,000 acres of land, this project will be developed in a span of 5–10 years but the residential communities will start being handed over to people in 2016. The global attractions of the project comprise the world's tallest building, the world's largest shopping mall, sports city, educational & medical city, international city, and a media city – all having the most modern facilities and amenities and the most advanced infrastructure. This project will provide employment to an estimated 2.5 million people, as well as provide housing to potentially millions of people.

See also
Pakistan Islands Development Authority
 List of islands of Pakistan
 Buddo Island

References

Further reading
 Pakistan agrees $43bn development

Islands of Karachi
Islands of Sindh